August 2021 Balochistan attacks may refer to:

August 2021 Quetta bombing
26 August 2021 Balochistan attacks